Stensland is a surname. Notable people with the surname include:

Andreas Stensland Løwe (born 1983), Norwegian jazz pianist 
Daniel Stensland (born 1989), Norwegian footballer
Dawn Stensland-Mendte (born 1964), American talk show host
Grace Nelson Stensland (1877 - 1907), American singer better known as Nelli Gardini
Gunnar Stensland (1922–2011), Norwegian footballer
Ingvild Stensland (born 1981), Norwegian footballer
Leiv Stensland (born 1934), Norwegian politician
Oddleif Stensland (born 1973), Norwegian vocalist and guitarist
Sveinung Stensland (born 1972), Norwegian politician